Kofi Baah (born 23 January 1998) is a Ghanaian professional footballer who plays as a goalkeeper for Ghanaian Premier league side Liberty Professionals F.C.

Career 
Baah started his career with lower-tier side Charity Stars before joining Liberty Professionals. He started his senior career with Liberty Professionals in 2017. On 25 June 2017, Baah made his debut for Liberty, starring in a 1–0 away win against Accra Great Olympics. That season, served as the back-up goalkeeper for Eric Andoh whilst making 4 league appearances. The following season, he featured played more matches featuring in 8 out of 15 league matches before the league was cancelled due to the Anas Number 12 Expose. During the 2019 GFA Normalization Committee Special Competition and 2019–20 Ghana Premier League season, he served as back-up goalkeeper to Ganiwu Shaibu and played two and four league matches respectively.

At the end of the 2020–21 season, even though at the end of the season Liberty Professionals were relegated to the Ghana Division One League, Baah was one of their standout performers within the season. He kept 11 clean-sheets in 26 League games only trailing to Razak Abalora of Asante Kotoko and Richard Attah of Hearts of Oak who both kept 12 clean-sheets. At the tail end of the season, he was serving as the club captain due to his impressive form.

References

External links 

 

Living people
1998 births
Ghanaian footballers
Association football goalkeepers
Liberty Professionals F.C. players
Charity Stars F.C. players
Ghana Premier League players